The Titan II ICBM Launch Complex 374-5 Site is a historic military installation in rural Faulkner County, Arkansas. Its ground-level access points have been back-filled with rubble or welded shut, and are discernible only by the presence of concrete pads and mounds of earth. Surface features also include the remnants of a helicopter pad and a theodolite siting marker, and the original access road to the facility from US 65. The facility was staffed by the 374th Strategic Missile Squadron between 1963 and 1986, housing an LGM-25C Titan II ICBM, and was decommissioned and rendered non-functional in 1987 under the terms of the SALT II strategic arms treaty.

The site was listed on the National Register of Historic Places in 2000.

See also
 Titan II ICBM Launch Complex 373-5 Site
 Titan II ICBM Launch Complex 374-7 Site
 National Register of Historic Places listings in Faulkner County, Arkansas

References

Military facilities on the National Register of Historic Places in Arkansas
Military installations established in 1963
Installations of Strategic Air Command
National Register of Historic Places in Faulkner County, Arkansas
Installations of the United States Air Force in Arkansas
1987 disestablishments in Arkansas